Pinchimuru (Quechua, Hispanicized spelling Pinchimuro) is a mountain in the Cusco Region in Peru, about  high. It is situated in the  Quispicanchi Province, Ccarhuayo District, west of the river Pinchimurumayu (Pinchimuro Mayo, also named Mapachu (Mapacho)).

References 

Mountains of Peru
Mountains of Cusco Region